Michael Wilson (July 1, 1914 – April 9, 1978) was an American screenwriter.

Life and career

Early life
Wilson was born and raised Roman Catholic in McAlester, Oklahoma. He graduated from UC Berkeley with a  bachelor's degree in philosophy in 1936 and did post-graduate fellowship work between 1937 and 1939.  He taught English and began his writing career with short stories for magazines. Then, starting in 1941, he wrote or co-wrote 22 screenplays.

Early Screenplays
Wilson was credited on The Men in Her Life  (1941) with Loretta Young.

He did some William Boyd westerns, Border Patrol (1943), Colt Comrades (1943), Bar 20 (1943), and Forty Thieves (1944).

Wilson's career in Hollywood was interrupted by service with the United States Marine Corps during World War II.

Return from World War Two
In 1945 he became a contract writer with Liberty Films, working (uncredited) on such pictures as It's a Wonderful Life (1946).

He was a co-winner of the Academy Award for Best Adapted Screenplay for A Place in the Sun (1951), and won an Edgar Award and another Oscar nomination for his script for 5 Fingers (1953).

Blacklisting
Wilson was named an unfriendly witness by the House Un-American Activities Committee and blacklisted for being a communist. After he was blacklisted, he left for France and worked on scripts for the European film industry.

While blacklisted, Wilson wrote the script for Salt of the Earth (1954), a fictionalized account of a real strike by zinc miners in Grant County, New Mexico. The movie was directed by Herbert Biberman and produced by Paul Jarrico both of whom had also been blacklisted. The film has been deemed "culturally significant" by the United States Library of Congress and selected for preservation in the National Film Registry.

He wrote or collaborated on scripts for Hollywood films without credit or under a pseudonym for much less than his usual fee before being blacklisted, including Carnival Story (1954) (for King Brothers Productions who often used blacklisted writers); They Were So Young (1954); The Court-Martial of Billy Mitchell (1955), for  Otto Preminger; Friendly Persuasion (1956), for William Wyler; The Bridge on the River Kwai (1957), for Sam Spiegel and David Lean; The Two-Headed Spy (1958); Tempest (1958) and 5 Branded Women (1960) for Dino De Laurentiis; and Lawrence of Arabia (1962) for Spiegel and Lean again.

His screenplay for Friendly Persuasion was nominated for an Academy Award, but was disqualified because his name did not appear in the credits. Director William Wyler wanted his brother, Robert Wyler, and Jessamyn West credited for rewriting the script, but Wilson disputed this. Wyler then was able under the rules of the blacklist to have one of the few films in history credited to no writer at all.

Wilson and Carl Foreman worked separately on The Bridge on the River Kwai, but as both were blacklisted, the official credit went to Pierre Boulle, upon whose novel the movie was based, even though Boulle did not even speak English.

Wilson remained in France with his family for nine years, before returning to live in Ojai, California in the United States in 1964.

Return to Hollywood
Wilson continued to write screenplays, including for The Sandpiper (1965), Planet of the Apes (1968), and Che! (1969). His screenplay for Planet of the Apes was based on a novel by Pierre Boulle; only Boulle received screen credit.

Michael Wilson was awarded Writers Guild of America's Laurel Award in 1975 and was posthumously awarded his second Academy Award in 1984 for The Bridge on the River Kwai.

In 1995, Wilson was credited by the academy's board of directors with an Academy Award nomination as a co-writer of Lawrence of Arabia and credited as the winner of the Writers' Guild of Great Britain Award for Best British Dramatic Screenplay.

Wilson also completed an unproduced screenplay on December 16, 1976, The Raid On Harper's Ferry, which was an adaptation of Truman J. Nelson's book The Old Man: John Brown at Harper's Ferry (1973). He also apparently wrote unproduced scripts for a movie about the Industrial Workers of the World titled The Wobblies and a movie about the infiltration of the Black Liberation Movement titled Quiet Darkness.

Personal life
Michael Wilson married Zelma Gussin in 1941; the couple had two daughters. Zelma's sister, Sylvia, was married to another blacklisted screenwriter, Paul Jarrico.  Michael Wilson died of a heart attack in 1978 in Los Angeles County, California.

Filmography
The Men in Her Life (1941)
Border Patrol (1943)
Colt Comrades (1943)
Bar 20 (1943)
Forty Thieves (1944)
It's a Wonderful Life (1946) (uncredited)
A Place in the Sun (1951)
5 Fingers (1952)
Salt of the Earth (1954)
Carnival Story (1954) (uncredited)
They Were So Young (1954) (uncredited)
The Court-Martial of Billy Mitchell (1955) (uncredited)
Friendly Persuasion (1956) (originally uncredited)
The Bridge on the River Kwai (1957) (originally uncredited)
The Two-Headed Spy (1958) (originally as James O'Donnell)
La Tempesta (1958) (uncredited)
5 Branded Women (1960) (originally uncredited)
Lawrence of Arabia (1962) (originally uncredited)
The Sandpiper (1965)
Planet of the Apes (1968)
Che! (1969)

References

Further reading
 Caballero, Raymond. McCarthyism vs. Clinton Jencks. Norman: University of Oklahoma Press, 2019.
Planet of the Apes (Magazine) #2, October 1974.  P. 48–52, "Michael Wilson: The Other Apes Writer," by David Johnson.  An exclusive interview with the co-author of the original Planet of the Apes movie.

Bibliography
Merck, Mandy (2007). Hollywood’s American Tragedies: Dreiser, Eisenstein, Sternberg, Stevens. Oxford: Berg Publishers. .

External links

Finding Aid for the Michael Wilson Papers, 1942-1977 The Online Archive of California
"'Under the table': Michael Wilson and the Screenplay for The Bridge on the River Kwai: for audiences, a screen masterpiece. For its blacklisted screenwriter, a saga of futility and bitterness, in epic proportions."

1914 births
1978 deaths
People from McAlester, Oklahoma
American male screenwriters
United States Marine Corps personnel of World War II
Hollywood blacklist
Best Adapted Screenplay Academy Award winners
Edgar Award winners
UC Berkeley College of Letters and Science alumni
United States Marines
Screenwriters from Oklahoma
20th-century American male writers
20th-century American screenwriters